Kelly Anundson (born August 29, 1984) is an American mixed martial artist. A professional competitor since 2010, Anundson has previously competed for Bellator, and was also a contestant on The Ultimate Fighter 19.

Background
Born and raised in a trucking family in Elma, Washington, Anundson began wrestling at the age of five. Talented, Anundson would go on to be a state champion in high school before continuing his career at Lassen College in California, and then transferred to Newberry College in South Carolina, where he was a three-time All-American. Anundson later began competing in mixed martial arts and grappling tournaments before he began training with American Top Team.

Mixed martial arts career

Early career
Anundson made his MMA debut in 2010. He won his first three bouts in the Palmetto Boxing Promotions organization before losing to UFC veteran Francis Carmont and Steven Cnudde, both via armbar submission. Anundson returned to the Palmetto Boxing Promotions, defeating Wade Hamilton via rear-naked choke submission in the first round. Anundson would win his next two bouts, both by stoppage in the first round.

The Ultimate Fighter
Anundson appeared as one of the contestants on The Ultimate Fighter 19, he faced future winner of the show Corey Anderson in the fight to get into the TUF house. He lost via unanimous decision, thus ending his run on the show.

Bellator MMA
Anundson made his Bellator debut on April 4, 2014, against Volkan Oezdemir at Bellator 115. He defeated Oezdemir via neck crank submission in the second round.

Anundson entered in the Bellator 2014 summer series light heavyweight tournament. He defeated Rodney Wallace in the quarterfinals at Bellator 121 on June 6, 2014 via three-round unanimous decision to move on to the semifinals.

Anundson faced Philipe Lins in the semifinals at Bellator 122 on July 25, 2014. In the first round, Lins injured his left knee while attempting a punch, causing the referee to stop the bout in favour of Anundson.

Anundson faced Liam McGeary in the finals on September 12, 2014 at Bellator 124. He lost the fight via submission in the first round.

Championships and accomplishments
Bellator MMA
Bellator 2014 Summer Series Light Heavyweight Tournament Runner-Up

Mixed martial arts record

|-
|Win
|align=center|10–3
|Joey Cabezas
|Submission
|High Desert Brawl 13
|
|align=center|1
|align=center|1:53
|Susanville, California, United States
|
|-
|Loss
|align=center|9–3
|Liam McGeary
|Submission (inverted triangle choke)
|Bellator 124
|
|align=center|1
|align=center|4:47
|Plymouth Township, Michigan, United States
|
|-
|Win
|align=center|9–2
|Philipe Lins
|TKO (knee injury)
|Bellator 122
|
|align=center|1
|align=center|1:40
|Temecula, California, United States
|
|-
|Win
|align=center|8–2
|Rodney Wallace
|Decision (unanimous)
|Bellator 121
|
|align=center|3
|align=center|5:00
|Thackerville, Oklahoma, United States
|
|-
|Win
|align=center|7–2
|Volkan Oezdemir
|Submission (neck crank)
|Bellator 115
|
|align=center|2
|align=center|3:19
|Las Vegas, Nevada, United States
|
|-
|Win
|align=center|6–2
|Carlos Zevallos
|TKO (punches)
|Fight Time 12: Warriors Collide
|
|align=center|1
|align=center|2:52
|Fort Lauderdale, Florida, United States
|
|-
|Win
|align=center|5–2
|Alessandro de Oliveira
|Submission (north-south choke)
|Lions Fighting Championship 2
|
|align=center|1
|align=center|N/A
|Neuchâtel, Switzerland
|
|-
|Win
|align=center|4–2
|Wade Hamilton
|Submission (rear-naked choke)
|Palmetto Boxing Promotions: Fight Night at the Point
|
|align=center|1
|align=center|1:00
|Mount Pleasant, South Carolina, United States
|
|-
|Loss
|align=center|3–2
|Steven Cnudde
|Submission (armbar)
|HFC 3: France vs. Europe
|
|align=center|2
|align=center|2:36
|Martigny, Valais, Switzerland
|
|-
|Loss
|align=center|3–1
|Francis Carmont
|Submission (armbar)
|SHC 4: Monson vs. Perak
|
|align=center|1
|align=center|2:06
|Geneva, Switzerland
|
|-
|Win
|align=center|3–0
|Jesus Santiago
|Submission (north-south choke)
|Palmetto Boxing Promotions: Judgment Day 1
|
|align=center|1
|align=center|1:41
|Columbia, South Carolina, United States
|
|-
|Win
|align=center|2–0
|Dann Cucuta
|Submission (armbar)
|Palmetto Boxing Promotions: Rage in the Cage
|
|align=center|1
|align=center|3:13
|Columbia, South Carolina, United States
|
|-
|Win
|align=center|1–0
|Chris McNally
|Decision (unanimous)
|Palmetto Boxing Promotions: Mayhem at the Medallion Center
|
|align=center|3
|align=center|5:00
|Columbia, South Carolina, United States 
|

References

External links

American male mixed martial artists
American practitioners of Brazilian jiu-jitsu
1984 births
Living people
People from Elma, Washington
Mixed martial artists from Washington (state)
Light heavyweight mixed martial artists
Mixed martial artists utilizing collegiate wrestling
Mixed martial artists utilizing Brazilian jiu-jitsu
American male sport wrestlers
Newberry Wolves wrestlers